The Santee tribe were a historical tribe of Siouan-language speakers from South Carolina. Historically the Santee were a small tribe (est. at a population of 3,000 around AD 1600), and centered in the area of the present town of Santee, South Carolina.  Their settlement was along the Santee River, since dammed and called Lake Marion.

History
Historically, the great majority of various Siouan-speaking tribes were found in the Great Plains states, where they had migrated and settled before European contact.

Some Siouan-speaking tribes also inhabited territory in present-day Virginia, Maryland and North Carolina. The Santee had Lower Town connections to the Lower Town Cherokee and the Creek people, due to the westward movement of such American Indian groups during the Colonial Conquest era. 

An earthwork mound believed to have been constructed by the Mississippian culture (1000-1500 AD) stands on the shore of Lake Marion. This structure was likely built by prehistoric indigenous peoples of the area, before the coalescence of the Santee as a tribe. The mound was probably used for the burial of a chief or shaman. Historically the Santee spoke Catawba.

The Santee Indian Mound near Summerton, South Carolina was listed in the National Register of Historic Places in 1969.

Contemporary groups
The Santee Indian Organization, a remnant tribe, was officially recognized by the South Carolina Commission for Minority Affairs on January 27, 2006. In 2000 estimated Santee population was approximately 6,000.

References

External links
 South Carolina - Indians, Native Americans - Santee

Native American tribes in South Carolina